This article provides details of international football games played by the Equatorial Guinea national football team from 2020 to present.

Results

2020

2021

2022

Forthcoming fixtures
The following matches are scheduled:

Notes

References

Equatorial Guinea national football team